Dingri Nagaraj is an Indian actor in the Kannada film industry. He acted in Solillada Saradara (1992), Dore (1995) and Bangarada Kalasha (1995).

Career
Dingri Nagaraj has acted in more than 165 movies in Kannada.

Selected filmography

 Mallige Hoove (1992)
 Rajadhi Raja (1992)
 Mane Devru (1993)
 Huli Hebbuli (1987)
 Maneye Manthralaya (1986)
 Shiva Kotta Sowbhagya (1985)
 Ninne Preethisuve (2002)
 Ajju (2004)
 Jagadeka Veera (1991)
 Prachanda Putanigalu (1981)
  Anupama  (1981)
 Avala Neralu (1983)

Television
 Gowripurada Gayyaligalu (2021)
 Sundari (2021–Present)
 Kadambari (2021)

Awards
 Kempegowda Award

See also

List of people from Karnataka
Cinema of Karnataka
List of Indian film actors
Cinema of India

References

External links

 Biography of Dingri Nagaraj on chiloka.com
 Biography of Dingri Nagaraj on filmibeat.com
 Biography of Dingri Nagaraj on bookmyshow.com

Male actors in Kannada cinema
Indian male film actors
Male actors from Karnataka
20th-century Indian male actors
21st-century Indian male actors